The 2020 Netball Superleague season was the fifteenth season of the Netball Superleague, the elite domestic netball competition in the United Kingdom. The season commenced on 22 February 2020. Manchester Thunder were the defending champions.  In the midst of the fourth round of matches, the league announced the postponement of all future matches until at least 30 April 2020, as a result of the COVID-19 pandemic. On 27 May 2020, the season was cancelled, with the fixtures declared null and void.

Overview

Teams

Format
The length of the regular season was originally expanded by one week to include 19 rounds, with the additional round counting towards each club's total points. The top four would have progressed to the playoffs and eventually two teams met in the Grand Final.

Fixtures

Round 1

Round 2

Round 3

Round 4

Table

References

External links
 Official Website

 
2020
2020 in English netball
2020 in Welsh women's sport
2020 in Scottish women's sport
Sports events curtailed and voided due to the COVID-19 pandemic